Cobosietta inermis is a species of beetle in the family Buprestidae, the only species in the genus Cobosietta.

References

Monotypic Buprestidae genera